The 41st South American Junior Championships in Athletics were held in Cuenca, Ecuador, between May 30–31, 2015.

Medal summary
Complete results are published.

Men

Women

Medal table
The medal table was published.

Participation
According to an unofficial count, 245 athletes from 11 countries participated, 6 athletes less than the officially published number of 251 comprising also those athletes that did not show.

References

External links
Event's Webpage (archived)
Results (archived)

South American U20 Championships in Athletics
South American Junior Championships in Athletics
South American Junior Championships in Athletics
International athletics competitions hosted by Ecuador
2015 in youth sport